Le cose della vita (The Things of Life) is an album by Italian singer-songwriter Antonello Venditti, released by RCA Italian in late 1973.  The record is a true "solo" venture, as Venditti wrote, arranged, produced and played every note himself.

Track listing
All songs written and arranged by Antonello Venditti.
"Mio padre ha un buco in gola" (My father has a hole in his throat")
"Mariù"
"Brucia Roma" (He Burns Rome)
"Le cose della vita"
"E li ponti so' soli" (And the Bridges are Alone)
"Il treno delle sette" (The 7:00 Train)
"Stupida signora" (Stupid Lady)
"Le tue mani su di me" (Your hands on me)

Cose della vita
Cose della vita